HPAC may refer to:

Hang Gliding and Paragliding Association of Canada
Hyde Park Art Center, in Chicago
Haugh Performing Arts Center, in Los Angeles
Hyogo Performing Arts Center, in Japan
Health Policy Advisory Committee, oversees Major League Baseball drug policy
H/P/A/C, an abbreviation for Hacking/Phreaking/Anarchy/Cracking (or sometimes Carding)
Heating, Piping, Air Conditioning, similar to HVAC
HPAC Engineering, a mechanical systems engineering magazine
Holy Pentecostal Assembly Churches
High Performance Analytics and Computing, e.g. in the Human Brain Project.